The 1971 Dutch Grand Prix was a Formula One motor race held at Zandvoort on 20 June 1971. It was race 4 of 11 in both the 1971 World Championship of Drivers and the 1971 International Cup for Formula One Manufacturers. Due to heavy rain, the track was treacherously wet and slippery, giving a large advantage to "wet-weather men" Jacky Ickx and Pedro Rodriguez, who also happened to be equipped with highly suitable cars and tyres.

This was the last Formula One race on a circuit with no safety features on it. Because of this the Dutch Grand Prix was canceled the next year, but the circuit came back in 1973; and the layout had been modified.

Classification

Qualifying 

 Peterson set his time in the March-Alfa Romeo

Race

Championship standings after the race

Drivers' Championship standings

Constructors' Championship standings

Note: Only the top five positions are included for both sets of standings.

References

External links

Dutch Grand Prix
Dutch Grand Prix
Grand Prix
Dutch Grand Prix